The 1968–69 Atlanta Hawks season was the team's first season in Atlanta, 20th in the NBA, and 23rd overall. The Hawks relocated from St. Louis, where the franchise played the previous thirteen seasons. Lenny Wilkens was traded to the Seattle SuperSonics in exchange for Walt Hazzard, who would help lead the Hawks to a second-place finish with a record of 48 wins and 34 losses. In the playoffs, the Hawks eliminated the San Diego Rockets in six games. In the Western Conference Finals, the Hawks challenged the Los Angeles Lakers; the Lakers would eliminate the Hawks in 5 games.

Draft picks

Roster

Regular season

Season standings

Record vs. opponents

Game log 

|- align="center" bgcolor="ffcccc"
| 1 || October 16 || Cincinnati || 110–125 || Alexander Memorial Coliseum || 0–1
|- align="center" bgcolor="ccffcc"
| 2 || October 19 || Milwaukee || 125–107 || Alexander Memorial Coliseum || 1–1
|- align="center" bgcolor="ccffcc"
| 3 || October 23 || Chicago || 106–91 || Alexander Memorial Coliseum || 2–1
|- align="center" bgcolor="ffcccc"
| 4 || October 25 || Seattle || 112–123 || Seattle Center Coliseum || 2–2
|- align="center" bgcolor="ccffcc"
| 5 || October 27 || Phoenix || 123–100 || Arizona Veterans Memorial Coliseum || 3–2
|- align="center" bgcolor="ffcccc"
| 6 || October 29 || L.A. Lakers || 124–125 || The Forum || 3–3
|- align="center" bgcolor="ffcccc"
| 7 || October 30 || San Diego || 116–127 || San Diego Sports Arena || 3–4
|-

|- align="center" bgcolor="ccffcc"
| 8 || November 1 || San Francisco || 109–105 || Alexander Memorial Coliseum || 4–4
|- align="center" bgcolor="ffcccc"
| 9 || November 3 || Boston || 103–123 || Alexander Memorial Coliseum || 4–5
|- align="center" bgcolor="ffcccc"
| 10 || November 6 || Baltimore || 119–140 || Baltimore Civic Center || 4–6
|- align="center" bgcolor="ccffcc"
| 11 || November 8 || San Diego || 114–101 || Alexander Memorial Coliseum || 5–6
|- align="center" bgcolor="ccffcc"
| 12 || November 9 || San Francisco || 113–106 || Alexander Memorial Coliseum || 6–6
|- align="center" bgcolor="ffcccc"
| 13 || November 12 || San Francisco || 108–123 || Oakland–Alameda County Coliseum Arena || 6–7
|- align="center" bgcolor="ccffcc"
| 14 || November 13 || Seattle || 142–113 || Seattle Center Coliseum || 7–7
|- align="center" bgcolor="ffcccc"
| 15 || November 15 || Philadelphia || 115–116 || Alexander Memorial Coliseum || 7–8
|- align="center" bgcolor="ffcccc"
| 16 || November 16 || Cincinnati || 125–130 || Cincinnati Gardens || 7–9
|- align="center" bgcolor="ffcccc"
| 17 || November 19 || Milwaukee || 89–119 || Milwaukee Arena || 7–10
|- align="center" bgcolor="ccffcc"
| 18 || November 20 || New York || 111–106 || Alexander Memorial Coliseum || 8–10
|- align="center" bgcolor="ccffcc"
| 19 || November 21 || Detroit || 129–121 || Cobo Arena || 9–10
|- align="center" bgcolor="ccffcc"
| 20 || November 23 || Chicago || 114–96 || Chicago Stadium || 10–10
|- align="center" bgcolor="ffcccc"
| 21 || November 24 || Baltimore || 111–118 || Alexander Memorial Coliseum || 10–11
|- align="center" bgcolor="ffcccc"
| 22 || November 26 || Baltimore || 99–102 || Baltimore Civic Center || 10–12
|- align="center" bgcolor="ccffcc"
| 23 || November 27 || Cincinnati || 94–91 || Alexander Memorial Coliseum || 11–12
|- align="center" bgcolor="ccffcc"
| 24 || November 30 || Cincinnati || 126–109 || Cincinnati Gardens || 12–12
|-

|- align="center" bgcolor="ffcccc"
| 25 || December 3 || New York || 93–126 || Madison Square Garden || 12–13
|- align="center" bgcolor="ffcccc"
| 26 || December 4 || New York || 113–121 || Alexander Memorial Coliseum || 12–14
|- align="center" bgcolor="ffcccc"
| 27 || December 6 || L.A. Lakers || 94–99 || Alexander Memorial Coliseum || 12–15
|- align="center" bgcolor="ccffcc"
| 28 || December 8 || Phoenix || 121–99 || Arizona Veterans Memorial Coliseum || 13–15
|- align="center" bgcolor="ccffcc"
| 29 || December 10 || San Francisco || 111–100 || Oakland–Alameda County Coliseum Arena || 14–15
|- align="center" bgcolor="ccffcc"
| 30 || December 12 || Seattle || 93–91 || Seattle Center Coliseum || 15–15
|- align="center" bgcolor="ccffcc"
| 31 || December 13 || L.A. Lakers || 105–103 || The Forum || 16–15
|- align="center" bgcolor="ccffcc"
| 32 || December 17 || Chicago || 87–83 || Chicago Stadium || 17–15
|- align="center" bgcolor="ccffcc"
| 33 || December 18 || Milwaukee || 122–116 || Alexander Memorial Coliseum || 18–15
|- align="center" bgcolor="ccffcc"
| 34 || December 21 || Detroit || 120–110 || Alexander Memorial Coliseum || 19–15
|- align="center" bgcolor="ccffcc"
| 35 || December 26 || Seattle || 126–96 || Alexander Memorial Coliseum || 20–15
|- align="center" bgcolor="ccffcc"
| 36 || December 28 || Boston || 110–97 || Alexander Memorial Coliseum || 21–15
|- align="center" bgcolor="ccffcc"
| 37 || December 29 || Baltimore || 101–99 || Alexander Memorial Coliseum || 22–15
|-

|- align="center" bgcolor="ccffcc"
| 38 || January 2 || Chicago || 106–88 || Chicago Stadium || 23–15
|- align="center" bgcolor="ccffcc"
| 39 || January 3 || Detroit || 128–106 || Cobo Arena || 24–15
|- align="center" bgcolor="ffcccc"
| 40 || January 4 || L.A. Lakers || 111–121 || Alexander Memorial Coliseum || 24–16
|- align="center" bgcolor="ccffcc"
| 41 || January 5 || Phoenix || 97–96 || Alexander Memorial Coliseum || 25–16
|- align="center" bgcolor="ffcccc"
| 42 || January 8 || Philadelphia || 111–112 || Spectrum || 25–17
|- align="center" bgcolor="ccffcc"
| 43 || January 10 || Detroit || 104–101 || Alexander Memorial Coliseum || 26–17
|- align="center" bgcolor="ccffcc"
| 44 || January 11 || L.A. Lakers || 104–100 || Alexander Memorial Coliseum || 27–17
|- align="center" bgcolor="ccffcc"
| 45 || January 16 || Phoenix || 112–107 || Columbia, South Carolina || 28–17
|- align="center" bgcolor="ccffcc"
| 46 || January 17 || Phoenix || 112–107 || Alexander Memorial Coliseum || 29–17
|- align="center" bgcolor="ccffcc"
| 47 || January 19 || New York || 100–96 || Alexander Memorial Coliseum || 30–17
|- align="center" bgcolor="ffcccc"
| 48 || January 21 || San Diego || 113–124 || San Diego Sports Arena || 30–18
|- align="center" bgcolor="ccffcc"
| 49 || January 22 || Phoenix || 125–107 || Arizona Veterans Memorial Coliseum || 31–18
|- align="center" bgcolor="ccffcc"
| 50 || January 24 || L.A. Lakers || 110–106 || Alexander Memorial Coliseum || 32–18
|- align="center" bgcolor="ccffcc"
| 51 || January 25 || Baltimore || 112–109 || Baltimore Civic Center || 33–18
|- align="center" bgcolor="ffcccc"
| 52 || January 26 || Philadelphia || 115–119 || Alexander Memorial Coliseum || 33–19
|- align="center" bgcolor="ffcccc"
| 53 || January 28 || Boston || 96–108 || Boston Garden || 33–20
|- align="center" bgcolor="ffcccc"
| 54 || January 29 || Philadelphia || 96–119 || Spectrum || 33–21
|- align="center" bgcolor="ffcccc"
| 55 || January 31 || Seattle || 112–119 || Alexander Memorial Coliseum || 33–22
|-

|- align="center" bgcolor="ccffcc"
| 56 || February 1 || Detroit || 119–99 || Alexander Memorial Coliseum || 34–22
|- align="center" bgcolor="ccffcc"
| 57 || February 2 || San Diego || 115–103 || Alexander Memorial Coliseum || 35–22
|- align="center" bgcolor="ffcccc"
| 58 || February 4 || New York || 97–122 || Madison Square Garden || 35–23
|- align="center" bgcolor="ccffcc"
| 59 || February 7 || Boston || 109–107 || Boston Garden || 36–23
|- align="center" bgcolor="ccffcc"
| 60 || February 8 || Chicago || 106–97 || Alexander Memorial Coliseum || 37–23
|- align="center" bgcolor="ffcccc"
| 61 || February 9 || Baltimore || 101–102 || Alexander Memorial Coliseum || 37–24
|- align="center" bgcolor="ffcccc"
| 62 || February 11 || San Francisco || 87–92 || Alexander Memorial Coliseum || 37–25
|- align="center" bgcolor="ccffcc"
| 63 || February 12 || Milwaukee || 113–106 || Milwaukee Arena || 38–25
|- align="center" bgcolor="ccffcc"
| 64 || February 14 || Boston || 104–101 || Alexander Memorial Coliseum || 39–25
|- align="center" bgcolor="ffcccc"
| 65 || February 16 || San Francisco || 106–113 || Alexander Memorial Coliseum || 39–26
|- align="center" bgcolor="ffcccc"
| 66 || February 17 || Milwaukee || 111–123 || Baltimore, MD || 39–27
|- align="center" bgcolor="ccffcc"
| 67 || February 18 || Cincinnati || 124–123 || Cleveland || 40–27
|- align="center" bgcolor="ccffcc"
| 68 || February 20 || Detroit || 97–87 || Cobo Arena || 41–27
|- align="center" bgcolor="ccffcc"
| 69 || February 23 || San Diego || 124–92 || Alexander Memorial Coliseum || 42–27
|- align="center" bgcolor="ffcccc"
| 70 || February 25 || New York || 101–122 || Madison Square Garden || 42–28
|- align="center" bgcolor="ffcccc"
| 71 || February 28 || Boston || 120–122 || Boston Garden || 42–29
|-

|- align="center" bgcolor="ccffcc"
| 72 || March 2 || Milwaukee || 112–108 || Alexander Memorial Coliseum || 43–29
|- align="center" bgcolor="ccffcc"
| 73 || March 6 || Philadelphia || 139–99 || Alexander Memorial Coliseum || 44–29
|- align="center" bgcolor="ccffcc"
| 74 || March 9 || Cincinnati || 134–107 || Alexander Memorial Coliseum || 45–29
|- align="center" bgcolor="ffcccc"
| 75 || March 11 || Chicago || 90–102 || Chicago Stadium || 45–30
|- align="center" bgcolor="ccffcc"
| 76 || March 12 || Chicago || 109–90 || Alexander Memorial Coliseum || 46–30
|- align="center" bgcolor="ffcccc"
| 77 || March 15 || Philadelphia || 120–122 || Spectrum || 46–31
|- align="center" bgcolor="ccffcc"
| 78 || March 16 || Seattle || 131–127 (OT) || Alexander Memorial Coliseum || 47–31
|- align="center" bgcolor="ccffcc"
| 79 || March 18 || San Francisco || 128–115 || Oakland–Alameda County Coliseum Arena || 48–31
|- align="center" bgcolor="ffcccc"
| 80 || March 20 || San Diego || 97–115 || San Diego Sports Arena || 48–32
|- align="center" bgcolor="ffcccc"
| 81 || March 21 || L.A. Lakers || 103–116 || The Forum || 48–33
|- align="center" bgcolor="ffcccc"
| 82 || March 23 || San Diego || 121–128 || San Diego Sports Arena || 48–34
|-

Playoffs 

|- align="center" bgcolor="#ccffcc"
| 1
| March 27
| San Diego
| W 107–98
| Lou Hudson (39)
| Bill Bridges (22)
| Ohl, Hazzard (3)
| Alexander Memorial Coliseum4,194
| 1–0
|- align="center" bgcolor="#ccffcc"
| 2
| March 29
| San Diego
| W 116–114
| Zelmo Beaty (31)
| Bill Bridges (14)
| Joe Caldwell (8)
| Alexander Memorial Coliseum6,006
| 2–0
|- align="center" bgcolor="#ffcccc"
| 3
| April 1
| @ San Diego
| L 97–104
| Zelmo Beaty (31)
| Zelmo Beaty (17)
| Joe Caldwell (6)
| San Diego Sports Arena9,340
| 2–1
|- align="center" bgcolor="#ffcccc"
| 4
| April 4
| @ San Diego
| L 112–114
| Walt Hazzard (34)
| Beaty, Bridges (11)
| Walt Hazzard (5)
| San Diego Sports Arena12,337
| 2–2
|- align="center" bgcolor="#ccffcc"
| 5
| April 6
| San Diego
| W 112–101
| Joe Caldwell (26)
| Bill Bridges (17)
| Caldwell, Hazzard (5)
| Alexander Memorial Coliseum4,007
| 3–2
|- align="center" bgcolor="#ccffcc"
| 6
| April 7
| @ San Diego
| W 108–106
| Lou Hudson (27)
| Bill Bridges (17)
| Caldwell, Hazzard (4)
| San Diego Sports Arena10,117
| 4–2
|-

|- align="center" bgcolor="#ffcccc"
| 1
| April 11
| Los Angeles
| L 93–95
| Zelmo Beaty (29)
| Bill Bridges (20)
| Walt Hazzard (6)
| The Forum16,190
| 0–1
|- align="center" bgcolor="#ffcccc"
| 2
| April 13
| @ Los Angeles
| L 102–104
| Joe Caldwell (34)
| Caldwell, Bridges (10)
| Bill Bridges (5)
| The Forum15,136
| 0–2
|- align="center" bgcolor="#ccffcc"
| 3
| April 15
| Los Angeles
| W 99–86
| Zelmo Beaty (22)
| Zelmo Beaty (15)
| Lou Hudson (5)
| Alexander Memorial Coliseum7,140
| 1–2
|- align="center" bgcolor="#ffcccc"
| 4
| April 17
| Los Angeles
| L 85–100
| Lou Hudson (35)
| Zelmo Beaty (20)
| Bill Bridges (5)
| Alexander Memorial Coliseum7,140
| 1–3
|- align="center" bgcolor="#ffcccc"
| 5
| April 20
| @ Los Angeles
| L 96–104
| Zelmo Beaty (30)
| Bill Bridges (22)
| Lou Hudson (7)
| The Forum16,273
| 1–4
|-

Player statistics

Season

Playoffs

Awards 
 Bill Bridges, NBA All-Defensive Second Team

Transactions

References 

Atlanta
Atlanta Hawks seasons
Atlanta
Atlanta